Apamea atrosuffusa is a species of cutworm or dart moth in the family Noctuidae first described by William Barnes and James Halliday McDunnough in 1913. It is found in North America.

The MONA or Hodges number for Apamea atrosuffusa is 9336.

References

Further reading

 
 
 

Apamea (moth)
Moths of North America
Moths described in 1913
Taxa named by William Barnes (entomologist)
Taxa named by James Halliday McDunnough
Articles created by Qbugbot